Archaeology is a bimonthly magazine for the general public, published by the Archaeological Institute of America. The institute also publishes the professional American Journal of Archaeology. The editor-in-chief was Peter Young until 2011 when he was replaced by Claudia Valentino. Jarrett A. Lobell assumed the editorship from Valentino in November 2018.

References

External links

Science and technology magazines published in the United States
Archaeology magazines
Magazines established in 1948
Bimonthly magazines published in the United States
Magazines published in New York City